Busega is a neighborhood within Kampala, Uganda's capital and largest city.

Location
Busega is in Lubaga Division, one of the five administrative divisions of Uganda's capital city. Busega is bordered by unincorporated Wakiso District to the north, Namungoona to the north-east, Lungujja to the east, Nateete to the south, and Buloba to the west. The coordinates of Busega are 0°18'36.0"N, 32°31'12.0"E (Latitude:0.3100; Longitude:32.5200).

Overview
Busega was the location of the first recorded killing of young Christians Makko Kakumba, Yusuf Rugarama, and Nuwa Sserwanga, all of them belonging to the Anglican faith. They were dismembered and burned on 31 January 1885 on the orders of Mwanga II of Buganda the Kabaka of Buganda.

The Kampala Northern Bypass Highway, which was opened in October 2009, ends in Busega where it joins the Entebbe-Kampala Highway, the dual-carriage toll expressway currently under construction. The Northern Bypass Highway is also undergoing expansion into a dual carriage way.

Landmarks
 Kampala Northern Bypass Highway, a  highway stretching from Nateete/Busega to the west, to Kireka/Bweyogerere to the east.
 Entebbe-Kampala Expressway, a dual carriage toll-highway that, when completed, will begin at Entebbe International Airport and join the Kampala Northern Bypass Highway at Busega
 Kampala–Masaka Road, a road from Kampala to Masaka coming off one of the roundabouts in Busega and continuing in a southwesterly direction, towards Kyengera, Mpigi, Kammengo,  Buwama, Kayabwe/Nkozi, and Masaka
 Kampala–Mityana Road, the road to Mityana, coming off a second roundabout in Busega and turning in a westerly direction, towards Buloba,  Bujuuko, Muduuma, Jjeza, Mityana, Mubende, and Fort Portal

See also
 Kajjansi
 Ndeeba
 Uganda Martyrs

References

External links
 Overview of the Uganda Christian Martyrs

Neighborhoods of Kampala
Cities in the Great Rift Valley
Lubaga Division